Junior Rau is a professional Papua New Guinean rugby league footballer who plays as a  for the PNG Hunters in the Queensland Cup and made his international debut against the Fiji Bati during the 2018 Pacific Rugby League Test in Sydney in June 2018 scoring twice in the Kumuls 26-14 victory.

References

1995 births
Living people
Papua New Guinean rugby league players
Papua New Guinea Hunters players
Papua New Guinea national rugby league team players
Rugby league wingers